Svitlana Malkova (born 1990, in Mykolaiv, Ukraine) is a Ukrainian female trampoline gymnast and member of the national team. She was champion of the World Games, medalist of the European Games and European Championships.

References

1990 births
Living people
Gymnasts at the 2019 European Games
European Games medalists in gymnastics
European Games silver medalists for Ukraine
Competitors at the 2017 World Games
Sportspeople from Mykolaiv
Ukrainian female trampolinists
World Games gold medalists
20th-century Ukrainian women
21st-century Ukrainian women